Chen Han (1360–1364), officially the Great Han, was a short-lived Chinese dynasty in the middle Yangtze region during the chaotic late Yuan dynasty. It was founded by the Red Turban rebel general Chen Youliang.

History 
Chen Youliang first dominated, and later assassinated the Red Turban leader Xu Shouhui and usurped his regional regime. 

At its height, Chen Han territory encompassed the modern provinces of Hubei, Jiangxi, and Hunan, but Jiangxi mostly fell to another warlord Zhu Yuanzhang in 1361. 

In 1363, Chen and Zhu fought in the decisive Battle of Lake Poyang, where Chen was killed. 

His teenaged son Chen Li succeeded him, but no longer had the resources to resist the powerful Zhu, who conquered Han the next year. 

Chen Li surrendered to Zhu and the Ming dynasty. Chen then moved to Goryeo (Korea), where he had children and became the progenitor of the Korean Yangsan Jin clan.

Genealogy 

 Some Chinese and Vietnamese records indicate that Chen Youliang was the son of Chen Yiji (陳益稷 or Trần Ích Tắc), a Yuan dynasty noble who was originally a leader of the Tran Dynasty.
 It is currently unclear what the relation between Chen Pucai and Chen Yiji is, or whether they are in fact the same person.

References 

Former countries in Chinese history
Transition from Yuan to Ming